Rolf Ericson (August 29, 1922 – June 16, 1997) was a Swedish jazz trumpeter. He also played the flugelhorn.

Early career 
Ericson was born in Stockholm, Sweden. He moved to New York City in 1947 and, in 1949, joined Charlie Barnet's big band and then with Woody Herman in 1950. Later, he worked with Paul Gonsalves, Charlie Parker, and Charles Mingus.

Returning to Sweden in 1950, he recorded as a leader and with Arne Domnérus, as well as for Leonard Feather's Swinging Swedes and Lars Gullin, He returned to the U.S. during 1953–1956, and played with the big bands of Charlie Spivak, Harry James, the Dorsey Brothers, and Les Brown, and was with the Lighthouse All-Stars. In 1956, he toured Sweden and played with Ernestine Anderson and Lars Gullin.

Later career 
From 1956 to 1965, he was back in the U.S., working with Dexter Gordon, Harold Land, Stan Kenton, Woody Herman, Maynard Ferguson, Buddy Rich, Benny Goodman, Gerry Mulligan, Dan Terry, Max Roach and Charles Mingus, among others. He was with the Duke Ellington Orchestra from 1963 until 1971. In the early 1960s, he made three recordings as a member of the Rod Levitt orchestra (octet). Ericson played with the Al Porcino Big Band in Berlin in the late 1970s and early 1980s.

Discography

As leader or co-leader
 1956 (May): Rolf Ericson & The American Stars (EmArcy, 1958) – Recordings originally issued by Metronome in Sweden, reissued on CD by Fresh Sound.
 1956 (June): Rolf Ericson & The American Stars 1956 with Ernestine Anderson (Dragon, 1995) – Sessions also issued on CD by Fresh Sound 
 1972: Oh Pretty Little Neida (Gazell)
 1975: Don't Get Around Much Anymore – Live at Bullerbyn (Polydor Grammofonverket)
 1978: Sincerely Ours (Four Leaf Clover) – co-led with Johnny Griffin
 1985: Stockholm Sweetnin (Dragon)
 1989: My Foolish Heart (Interplay) – with Lex Jasper
 1997: I Love You So... (Amigo)
 1998: Beautiful Love (Four Leaf Clover) – with the Metropole Orchestra, recorded in Hilversum, Netherlands, 1980–1989

As sideman
With Jan Allan
 Jan Allan ’70 (MCA, 1970)
With Chet Baker
 Witch Doctor (Contemporary, 1953 [1985])
With Curtis Counce
Exploring the Future (Dooto, 1958)
With Arne Domnérus
 Arne Domnérus And His Orchestra 1950/1951 With Rolf Ericson Featuring Lars Gullin (Dragon, 2003)
 In Concert With Bengt Hallberg & Rolf Ericson (Phontastic, 1978 [1984])
With Kenny Dorham
 Scandia Skies (SteepleChase, 1963 [1980])
With Duke Ellington
 Duke Ellington in Grona Lund 1963 (Storyville, 2014)
 Ellington at Basin Street (Music & Arts, 1964)
 Harlem (Pablo, 1964 [1985])
 Ellington '65 (Reprise, 1964)
 70th Birthday Concert (Solid State, 1970)
 Duke Ellington in Sweden 1973 featuring Alice Babs (Caprice)
With Art Farmer
 Listen to Art Farmer and the Orchestra (Mercury, 1962)
With Maynard Ferguson
Double Exposure (Atlantic, 1961) – with Chris Connor
Two's Company (Roulette, 1961) with Chris Connor
 Maynard '61 (Roulette, 1961)
 Maynard '64 (Roulette 1958-62 [1963])
With Dexter Gordon
 After Hours (SteepleChase, c.1969 [1986])
 After Midnight (SteepleChase, c.1969 [1987])
With Lars Gullin
 Jazz Amour Affair (Odeon, 1971)
With Johnny Hodges
 Everybody Knows Johnny Hodges (Impulse! 1964)
With Quincy Jones
 The Great Wide World of Quincy Jones Live! (Mercury, 1961 [1984])
 Live In Ludwigshafen 1961 (Jazzhaus, 2016)
With Stan Kenton
 Viva Kenton! (Capitol, 1959)
 Standards in Silhouette (Capitol, 1959)
 Road Show (Capitol, 1959) – with June Christy and The Four Freshmen
With Harold Land
 Harold in the Land of Jazz (Contemporary, 1958)
With Rod Levitt
 The Dynamic Sound Patterns (Riverside, 1963)
 Insight (RCA Victor), 1964)
 Solid Ground (RCA Victor, 1965)
With Charles Mingus
 The Complete Town Hall Concert (Blue Note, 1962 [1994])
 The Black Saint and the Sinner Lady (Impulse!, 1963)
 Mingus Mingus Mingus Mingus Mingus (Impulse!, 1963)
With Buddy Rich
 Blues Caravan (Verve, 1961)
With Leo Wright
 It's All Wright - Plays 12 All-Time-Hits (BASF, 1973)

References

1922 births
1997 deaths
Musicians from Stockholm
Bebop trumpeters
Duke Ellington Orchestra members
Savoy Records artists
Swedish jazz trumpeters
Male trumpeters
Swing trumpeters
20th-century American musicians
Male jazz musicians
Radiojazzgruppen members
EmArcy Records artists
20th-century Swedish male musicians
Swedish emigrants to the United States